The Università degli studi Internazionali di Roma (Italian for "International University of Rome" - UNINT) is a private state-recognised university located in Rome, Italy.

The university was founded in 1996 as Libero Istituto Universitario "San Pio V" and later renamed into Libera Università degli Studi "San Pio V" (LUSPIO). It adopted the present name in 2013 to underline more effectively the global vocation of its educational offer.

Organisation
The university comprises three faculties:

 Faculty of Economics
 Faculty of Interpreting and Translation
 Faculty of Political Sciences and Psycho-social Dynamics

See also 
 List of Italian universities
 Rome

References

External links
UNINT Website 

Universities in Italy
Universities and colleges in Rome
Educational institutions established in 1966
1966 establishments in Italy
Rome Q. X Ostiense